Sleepers’ Reign is a Belgian indie pop band from Herentals, Antwerp.

History 
Sleepers' Reign was founded in 2010 by childhood friends Lukas Hermans, Ruben Mertens, Orson Wouters and Jasper Verdonck. They started out producing their first demo's in their bedroom studio. In 2012 they played their first live shows competing in Humo's Rock Rally, a biennial music contest, in which they finished second and won the audience prize. The following year, the band released their first single Four Dots, together with a cover of Bob Dylan’s Like a Rolling Stone, whereupon they opened for Daniel Johnston and played Oppikoppi festival in Limpopo, South Africa.

From 2014 to 2016, the band supported John Parish and How to Dress Well in Belgium and played at CMJ Music Marathon in New York City.

On 4 March 2016 Sleepers’ Reign released their debut album King Into Delight (recorded and mixed by Justin Gerrish), along with an interactive mobile app that allows fans to listen to the album, read the lyrics and customize the album artwork. After their release concert in the Ancienne Belgique, the band showcased their album at SXSW, Austin, Texas, opened for Manic Street Preachers in Belgium and The Netherlands, and played Pukkelpop festival.

Discography 

 Four Dots / Like A Rolling Stone (2013)
 King Into Delight (2016)

References

External links 
 

Indie pop groups
Belgian rock music groups
Belgian electronic music groups